Le Châtelet (2,537 m) is a mountain of the Swiss Mont Blanc massif, overlooking Orsières in the canton of Valais. It lies between the valleys of Orny and Saleina.

References

External links
 Le Châtelet on Hikr

Mountains of the Alps
Mountains of Valais
Mountains of Switzerland
Two-thousanders of Switzerland